The 2020 season of Global Rapid Rugby ended after only one round of competition due to the COVID-19 pandemic and was not continued. The season was launched in February 2020 as the first full home and away Rapid Rugby tournament, following the shorter showcase series held the previous year.

It featured six teams from across the Asia-Pacific region competing for A$1 million in prize money. On 15 March 2020 the competition was suspended due to travel, quarantine and public health restrictions, before being cancelled on 7 April 2020.

Teams
The following six teams were announced for the Rapid Rugby season in 2020:

Notes

Standings
The top two teams in the standings after the completion of the regular season were scheduled to meet in a grand final match on 6 June to decide the championship title. A modified version of the rugby bonus points system was used.

One bonus point was awarded for each of the following in a game:
 a team scoring 4 or more tries;
 a winning team scoring at least 3 tries more than their opponent; 
 a team defeated by a margin of 5 points or under.

Four points were awarded for a win and none for a loss. Two points were awarded to each team for a draw.

Regular season 
The schedule was announced in February 2020.

Round 1 

The remaining nine rounds of competition matches and the final were cancelled.

References

External links
 Rapid Rugby official website
 2020 player transfers at asierugby.net

Global Rapid Rugby
Global Rapid Rugby
Global Rapid Rugby
Global Rapid Rugby